The Michael E. Moritz College of Law is the professional graduate law school of the Ohio State University, a public land-grant research university in Columbus, Ohio. Founded in 1891, the school is located in Drinko Hall on the main campus of the Ohio State University in Columbus. The school is accredited by the American Bar Association and is a charter member of the Association of American Law Schools.

According to the Moritz College of Law's official 2016 ABA-required disclosures, 77% of the Class of 2016 obtained full-time, long-term, bar passage-required employment nine months after graduation, excluding solo-practitioners.  This ranked Moritz 24th in the United States and 1st in Ohio for job placement of recent law graduates.

History

The board of trustees of the Ohio State University officially sanctioned a law school in June 1885 after approving a resolution introduced by trustee Peter H. Clark, an early African-American civil rights activist.  However, it was not until October 1891 that the law school was formally opened to 33 students, including 1 woman, in the basement of the second Franklin County Courthouse.  Marshall Jay Williams, a Justice of the Ohio Supreme Court served as the first dean of the law school and lectured for two years before resigning in 1893.  In 1896, the University elevated the law school to its present-day College of Law status.

In 1903, the College of Law moved to Page Hall, its first permanent building on the main campus of the University (now home to the John Glenn College of Public Affairs), named in honor of Henry F. Page, a prominent Ohio attorney who had left his estate to the University.  Over the next four decades, the College of Law experienced rapid growth under the successive leadership of deans William F. Hunter, Joseph H. Outhwaite, John Jay Adams and Herschel W. Arant.  Today, the College of Law continues its growth in national stature under the successive leadership of deans Gregory H. Williams, Nancy H. Rogers, Alan C. Michaels, and Lincoln L. Davies.

The modern-day building that now houses the Moritz College of Law since 1958, Drinko Hall, is named after internationally known attorney and College of Law benefactor John Deaver Drinko, former Managing Partner of BakerHostetler in Cleveland, Ohio. Drinko graduated from the College of Law in 1944 and received a Distinguished Alumnus Award in 1991.  In 2001, the College of Law received a $30 million donation from benefactor Michael E. Moritz, former partner of BakerHostetler in Columbus, Ohio. Moritz received his undergraduate degree from the Ohio State University Fisher College of Business in 1941 and law degree from the College of Law in 1944, where he graduated at the top of his class.  At the time, it was the largest single gift to the Ohio State University (in 2011, the University received a $100 million gift from Les Wexner).  The donation provided full-tuition grants with stipends to 30 law students, 4 endowed faculty chairs, 3 service awards for students, and a fund for use by the dean.  The College of Law completed a supplemental campaign to raise an additional $30 million to match Moritz's gift and make further improvements.

Academic reputation
Above the Law ranked the Moritz College of Law as the 26th best law school in America in 2019. Business Insider ranked the Moritz College of Law as the 18th best law school in America and the 5th best public law school in America in 2016. U.S. News & World Report ranked the Moritz College of Law's full-time Juris Doctor program the 30th best law school in America in 2023, (up from 40th in 2022), and 1st for dispute resolution in 2015.

According to professor Brian Leiter's "Scholarly Impact Score," the Moritz College of Law faculty ranks 19th in scholarly impact in 2015, as measured by the amount of law journal citations of Moritz faculty articles over the past five years. Specifically, professor and Heck-Faust Memorial Chair in Constitutional Law, Ruth Colker, was amongst the most-cited legal scholars in critical theory between 2010 and 2014.

Journals
The Ohio State Moritz College of Law publishes five legal journals:

 The Ohio State Law Journal was founded in 1935 as the "Law Journal of the Student Bar Association" and was originally a "section" of the Student Bar Association and funded by student contributions. Robert E. Leach '35, former Chief Justice of the Ohio Supreme Court, was the first editor of the Law Journal.  Today, the journal is edited by students and publishes six issues each year. In April 2012, OSLJ launched Furthermore, an online supplement to the print version, which in 2019 became Ohio State Law Journal Online. According to Bepress and its ExpressO Top 100 Law Review Rankings, the Ohio State Law Journal is the most popular law review accessed by authors on its online submission delivery service for legal scholars. 
The Ohio State Technology Law Journal (published semiannually; interdisciplinary journal focused on the intersection of technology and the law; faculty-edited in collaboration with student editors).
The Ohio State Journal on Dispute Resolution (sponsored quarterly journal of the American Bar Association focusing on alternative dispute resolution; student-edited; founded in 1985).
The Ohio State Journal of Criminal Law (published semiannually; peer-evaluated, faculty-student cooperative venture).
The Ohio State Business Law Journal (published semiannually; student run; focuses on legal issues facing entrepreneurs, small business owners, and venture capitalists).

Moot Court & Lawyering Skills Program

The Moot Court & Lawyering Skills Program includes intramural competitions and inter-scholastic teams covering various areas of the law. The Moot Court and Lawyering Skills Governing Board is responsible for organizing and administering four intramural competitions: the Herman Moot Court Competition, Colley Trial Practice Competition, the Representation in Mediation Competition, and the Lawrence Negotiations Competition. The Moot Court Board is a student-run organization that oversees and assists various Moot Court teams that compete nationally against other schools.

Center for Interdisciplinary Law and Policy Studies
The Center for Interdisciplinary Law and Policy Studies carries out research dealing with critical contemporary policy issues.  Three areas are of particular interest:
Law and humanities, focusing on legal history and culture.
Law, policy, and social sciences, focusing on empirical research, judicial behavior, and policy influences.
Law and the information society, focusing on privacy, security, E-government, and E-democracy.

Post-graduation employment
According to the College of Law's official 2016 ABA-required disclosures, 77% of the Class of 2016 obtained full-time, long-term, bar passage-required employment nine months after graduation, excluding solo-practitioners. Moritz College of Law ranked 24th out of 201 ABA-approved law schools in terms of the percentage of 2016 graduates with non-school-funded, full-time, long-term, bar passage required jobs nine months after graduation.

The College of Law's Law School Transparency under-employment score is 8.5%, indicating the percentage of the Class of 2015 unemployed, pursuing an additional degree, or working in a non-professional, short-term, or part-time job nine months after graduation. 97% of the Class of 2015 was employed in some capacity while 1% were pursuing graduate degrees and 2% were unemployed nine months graduation.

Ohio was the main employment destination for 2015 Moritz College of Law graduates, with 77% of employed 2015 graduates working in the state.

Costs

The total cost of attendance (indicating the cost of tuition, fees, and living expenses) at the College of Law for the 2014–2015 academic year is estimated at $49,496 for Ohio residents and $64,448 for non-residents. Moritz College of Law's in-state tuition and fees on average increased by 5.73% annually over the past five years while its non-resident tuition and fees on average increased by 3.55% over the past five years.

The Law School Transparency estimated debt-financed cost of attendance for three years is $185,780. The average indebtedness of the 87% of 2013 College of Law graduates who took out loans was $97,624.

Scholarships

Moritz Scholars
The Moritz Merit Scholarship Fund was established in 2001 by Michael E. Moritz '61.  The Scholarship is designed to attract and train a select group of students with outstanding academic and personal histories in a variety of areas including academia, business, law, government, and public interest. In recent years, the Moritz family has criticized Ohio State for using the scholarship fund to pay for fundraising.

Barton Scholars

The Robert K. Barton Memorial Scholarship Fund was established in 1968 by golf legend and Ohio State University alumnus Jack Nicklaus. The Scholarship was established in memory of his good friend and Moritz College of Law alumnus Robert K. Barton '62, one of central Ohio's top amateur golfers and law partner of former Ohio Governor and fellow Moritz alumnus John W. Bricker. Barton, his wife Linda, and another couple were killed when their private plane crashed en route to watch Nicklaus play in the 1966 Masters Tournament.

Notable faculty

The Moritz College of Law has 80 faculty members.  Notable current and former faculty members include:
Michelle Alexander, human rights advocate and author of The New Jim Crow: Mass Incarceration in the Age of Colorblindness
Christopher M. Fairman, former C. William O'Neill Professor in Law and Judicial Administration
Edward Foley, theorist of the blue shift and former Ohio Solicitor General
E. Gordon Gee, President Emeritus
Joan Krauskopf, Professor Emeritus of Law of the Moritz College of Law
Alan C. Michaels, Dean and Edwin M. Cooperman Chair in Law
Mary Ellen O'Connell, former William B. Saxbe Designated Professor of Law in the Moritz College of Law
John Quigley, President's Club Professor Emeritus of Law
Nancy H. Rogers, Dean, Emeritus Michael E. Moritz Chair in Alternative Dispute Resolution and Ohio Attorney General
Peter M. Shane, Jacob E. Davis and Jacob E. Davis II Chair in Law
Philip C. Sorensen, Professor Emeritus of Law and 27th Lieutenant Governor of Nebraska
Peter Swire, former C. William O'Neil Professor in Law and Judicial Administration

Notable alumni

The Ohio State University Moritz College of Law has approximately 10,000 alumni across the United States. Selected notable alumni include:

John W. Bricker (1920), 54th Governor of Ohio and United States Senator from Ohio; proposed Bricker Amendment to U.S. Constitution
John W. Creighton Jr. (1957), President and CEO of the Weyerhaeuser Company
Ann Donnelly (1984), United States District Judge for the Eastern District of New York
Bruce Downey (1973), Chairman and CEO of Barr Pharmaceuticals
Robert Duncan (1952), first African-American United States District Judge for Ohio and Ohio Supreme Court Justice 
William Miller Drennen (1938), Chief Judge of the United States Tax Court
Israel Moore Foster (1898), United States Congressman from Ohio; proposed Child Labor Amendment to U.S. Constitution
William Isaac (1969), Chairman of the Federal Deposit Insurance Corporation
Robert E. Leach (1935), Chief Justice of the Ohio Supreme Court
Yvette McGee Brown (1985), first African-American female justice of the Ohio Supreme Court
Howard Metzenbaum (1941), United States Senator from Ohio; introduced WARN Act
Nick Mileti (1956), founder and owner of the Cleveland Cavaliers and owner of the Cleveland Indians
Erin Moriarty (1977), Emmy Award-winning journalist for CBS News and 48 Hours 
Thomas J. Moyer (1964), Chief Justice of the Ohio Supreme Court 
William Moore McCulloch (1925), United States Congressman from Ohio; key supporter of the Civil Rights Act of 1964
Willian Natcher (1933), longest-serving United States Congressman from Kentucky; Presidential Citizens Medal recipient
C. William O'Neill (1942), 59th Governor of Ohio and Chief Justice of the Ohio Supreme Court
Michael Oxley (1969), United States Congressman from Ohio; introduced Sarbanes–Oxley Act
Donald Clinton Power (1926), Chairman and CEO of GTE Corporation
Brian Sandoval (1989), 29th Governor of Nevada and United States District Judge for the District of Nevada 
William Saxbe (1948), 70th United States Attorney General and United States Senator from Ohio
Don W. Sears (1948), Dean and Professor Emeritus of Law at the University of Colorado Law School
Zack Space (1986), United States Congressman from Ohio
Jeffrey Sutton (1990), United States Court of Appeals Judge for the Sixth Circuit
Gregory J. Vincent (1987), President of Hobart and William Smith Colleges
George Voinovich (1961), 65th Governor of Ohio and United States Senator from Ohio

References

External links
Official website

Law schools in Ohio
Educational institutions established in 1891
Colleges, schools, and departments of Ohio State University
1891 establishments in Ohio